Nicolas Ernesto Maduro Guerra (born 21 June 1990) is a Venezuelan politician and the son of the President of Venezuela, Nicolás Maduro. He was appointed as Head of the Corps of Special Inspectors of the Presidency and Coordinator of the National Film School of Venezuela by his father. He was also elected by the PSUV party congress in 2014 to be the delegate of El Valle Capital District.

Early life and education
Maduro Guerra was born in Venezuela on 21 June 1990. He is the son of his father's first marriage with Adriana Guerra Angulo. As a child, he was interested in arts and between 1998 and 2004, he was a flautist in Venezuela's El Sistema program. Though Maduro Guerra sought a career in music, he placed 77 of 235 on a waiting list for the National Experimental University of the Arts and decided to abandon the idea. His high school scores were "not extraordinary", he scored 42.368% in reading classes and 64.461% in mathematics, graduating from Liceo Urbaneja Achelpohl School.

Maduro Guerra attended the National Experimental University of the Armed Forces where he specialized in economics. In 2011, he began working for the Public Ministry of Venezuela until his condition became unknown among the organization in 2014.

Political career
Maduro Guerra's political career began shortly after his father became President of Venezuela. On 23 September 2013, he was appointed by his father as Head of the Corps of Special Inspectors of the Presidency, an organization designated to observe the effects of policies implemented by the President of Venezuela. On his 24th birthday on 21 June 2014, his father again appointed him as Coordinator of the National Film School of Venezuela. Prior to his appointments, Maduro Guerra had little experience as a politician and no experience in cinema.

On 21 July 2014, the PSUV held a party congress and voted for Maduro Guerra to be a delegate for the El Valle Capital District.

Constituent Assembly

Following the 2017 Venezuelan Constituent Assembly election, Maduro Guerra was elected into the 2017 Constituent Assembly of Venezuela.

On 11 August 2017, US President Donald Trump said that he is "not going to rule out a military option" to confront the government of Nicolás Maduro and the deepening crisis in Venezuela. Maduro Guerra responded, stating during the 5th Constituent Assembly of Venezuela session that if the United States were to attack Venezuela, "the rifles would arrive in New York, Mr. Trump, we would arrive and take the White House".

Controversy

Nepotism
His father President Maduro and his wife Cilia Flores were accused of nepotism for allegedly placing family members in positions throughout the Venezuelan government. His appointments as Head of the Corps of Special Inspectors of the Presidency and Coordinator of the National Film School were criticized as examples of his family's acts of alleged nepotism.

On 25 January 2017, President Maduro again named his son as the director of a newly established position, the Director General of Presidential Delegations and Instructions of the Vice President, raising more allegations of nepotism.

Jose Zalt wedding incident

At the wedding of Jose Zalt, a Syrian-Venezuelan businessman that owns the clothing brand Wintex, on 14 March 2015, Maduro Guerra was showered with American dollars at the gathering in the luxurious Gran Melia Hotel in Caracas. The incident caused outrage among Venezuelans who believed this to be hypocritical of President Maduro, especially since many Venezuelans were experiencing hardships due to the poor state of the economy and due to the president's public denouncements of capitalism. During a PSUV National Congress, Maduro Guerra responded to the incident, calling it "gossip".

Photograph incident 

During a first communion party in the Creole Club of Maracaibo, a woman named Rita Morales took photographs of Maduro Guerra with her cellphone. According to witnesses, Maduro arrived at the party surrounded by bodyguards and far from the rest of the guests. The bodyguards tried to take the cellphone away from Morales and force her to delete the pictures after realizing that Maduro was photographed. Morales refused and left the party; days after the incident, she was visited by officers that, according to witnesses, broke her cellphone. On 8 June 2017, officers of the Bolivarian Intelligence Service (SEBIN) detained Morales and her husband when they were about to aboard a private flight to Aruba in the La Chinita International Airport. Morales was taken to the SEBIN headquarters in El Helicoide.

Sanctions 
The United States sanctioned Maduro Guerra on 28 June 2019 for being a current or former official of the Government of Venezuela, as well as being a member of Venezuela's Constituent Assembly.

Personal life
Maduro Guerra is married to Grysell Torres and has two daughters; one born in 2007 and the other born in 2014.

References

External links

1990 births
Living people
United Socialist Party of Venezuela politicians
Children of national leaders
Members of the Venezuelan Constituent Assembly of 2017